The 2006 TCU Horned Frogs football team represented Texas Christian University in the 2006 NCAA Division I FBS football season.  The team was led by head coach Gary Patterson and played their home games at Amon G. Carter Stadium in Fort Worth, Texas.  TCU finished the season with an overall record of 11–2 with a 6–2 mark in the Mountain West Conference, where they placed second behind BYU.  The Horned Frogs were invited to the Poinsettia Bowl, where they defeated Northern Illinois, 37–7.

Schedule

Rankings

Roster

Coaches

Game summaries

Baylor

UC Davis

Texas Tech

BYU

Utah

Army

Wyoming

UNLV

New Mexico

San Diego State

Colorado State

Air Force

Poinsettia Bowl

References

TCU
TCU Horned Frogs football seasons
Poinsettia Bowl champion seasons
TCU Horned Frogs football